Luanco (Asturian: Lluanco) is the capital parish of the municipality of Gozón, within the province of Asturias, in northern Spain.

The population is 5,693 (INE 2007).

Luanco was an important fishing and whaling port. Currently, Luanco is a relevant tourist point in norther Spain, well known by its historic buildings (Santa María church, the Torre del Reloj or the Palace of Menéndez Pola), the beaches of Santa María and La Ribera and gastronomy as well.

Villages and hamlets
Aramar
Balbín
Legua
Luanco (capital)
Mazorra
Moniello
Peroño
Santa Ana

Gallery

References

Parishes in Gozón